Thomas Munkelt (born 3 August 1952) is a retired East German athlete, winner of 110 m hurdles at the 1980 Summer Olympics.

Born in Zedtlitz, Bezirk Leipzig, East Germany, Thomas Munkelt was a classic high hurdler who dominated European hurdling in the 1970s and early 1980s. Munkelt was the first athlete to break the 7.50 seconds barrier in the 60m hurdles, when he ran a 7.48 seconds World Record in Budapest in 1983.

Munkelt came into the international athletics scene in 1975 when he won his first of nine East German national championship title and European Cup in 110 m hurdles. Although he finished disappointing fifth at the 1976 Summer Olympics, he won both World Cup and European Cup in 1977. The first international championships medal came, when Munkelt finished first at the 1978 European Championships.

Munkelt's career highlight came at the Moscow Olympics, where he beat second placed Alejandro Casañas from Cuba by 0.01 seconds. He also was a member of fifth placed 4 × 100 m relay team.  He defended his title successfully at the 1982 European Championships and won silver as a member of a 4x100 relay team. He won again the European Cup in the next year, but finished only fifth at the first World Championships.

After hearing the East German government's decision to boycott the 1984 Summer Olympics, Munkelt decided to retire from athletics.

His personal best was 13,37 seconds, achieved in August 1977 in Helsinki. This ranks him seventh among German 110 m hurdlers, behind Florian Schwarthoff, Mike Fenner, Eric Kaiser, Falk Balzer, Thomas Blaschek and Sven Göhler.

References

External links

European Indoor Championships

1952 births
Living people
People from Borna
People from Bezirk Leipzig
East German male hurdlers
East German male sprinters
Sportspeople from Saxony
Olympic athletes of East Germany
Athletes (track and field) at the 1976 Summer Olympics
Athletes (track and field) at the 1980 Summer Olympics
Olympic gold medalists for East Germany
World Athletics Championships athletes for East Germany
European Athletics Championships medalists
Medalists at the 1980 Summer Olympics
Olympic gold medalists in athletics (track and field)
Universiade medalists in athletics (track and field)
Recipients of the Patriotic Order of Merit in silver
Universiade bronze medalists for East Germany
Medalists at the 1973 Summer Universiade
Medalists at the 1979 Summer Universiade
Friendship Games medalists in athletics